Stanislaus ("Stan") van Belkum (born February 1, 1961 in Warmond) is a former water polo player from the Netherlands, who participated in two Summer Olympics. In 1980 he finished in sixth position with the Dutch team. Four years later in Los Angeles Van Belkum once again gained the sixth spot in the final rankings with Holland.

References
 Dutch Olympic Committee

1961 births
Living people
Dutch male water polo players
Olympic water polo players of the Netherlands
Water polo players at the 1980 Summer Olympics
Water polo players at the 1984 Summer Olympics
People from Teylingen
Sportspeople from South Holland
20th-century Dutch people